Almond Gardens is a populated community in the Similkameen Division Yale Land District of British Columbia.  The small community is southwest of Grand Forks, British Columbia.

References

Populated places in the Boundary Country